He Gets Me High is the third EP by Dum Dum Girls, released March 1, 2011 by Sub Pop.

Promotion
A music video for the song "He Gets Me High" was released March 29, 2011.

Reception

The album received generally positive reviews upon its release. At Metacritic, which assigns a rating out of 100 to reviews from mainstream critics, the album received an average score of 76, based on 11 reviews, which indicates "Generally favorable reviews".

Track listing
All songs written by Dee Dee, except where noted.

References

2011 EPs
Dum Dum Girls albums